Claudia Vázquez Lippi (born 2 November 1990) is a Puerto Rican retired footballer who has played as a forward and a midfielder. She has been a member of the Puerto Rico women's national team.

Early and personal life
Vázquez was raised in Belford, New Jersey.

References

1990 births
Living people
Middletown High School North alumni
Women's association football forwards
Women's association football midfielders
Puerto Rican women's footballers
Puerto Rico women's international footballers
Competitors at the 2010 Central American and Caribbean Games
Puerto Rican people of Italian descent
Soccer players from New Jersey
Sportspeople from Monmouth County, New Jersey
People from Middletown Township, New Jersey

Monmouth Hawks women's soccer players